is Morning Musume's 71st single.

Information 
This was the last single to feature 14th generation member Chisaki Morito. 
The version of I Wish included as an additional track in the Limited Edition SP was recorded by the Morning Musume '22 lineup and it was released digitally on March 18, 2022.

Featured lineup 

 9th generation: Mizuki Fukumura, Erina Ikuta
 10th generation: Ayumi Ishida
 11th generation: Sakura Oda
 12th generation: Miki Nonaka, Maria Makino, Akane Haga
 13th generation: Kaede Kaga, Reina Yokoyama
 14th generation: Chisaki Morito
 15th th generation: Rio Kitagawa, Homare Okamura, Mei Yamazaki

Chu Chu Chu Bokura no Mirai Vocalist 

Main Voc: Chisaki Morito

Center Voc: Mizuki Fukumura, Reina Yokoyama

Minor Voc: Erina Ikuta, Ayumi Ishida, Sakura Oda, Miki Nonaka, Maria Makino, Akane Haga,  Kaede Kaga, Rio Kitagawa, Homare Okamura, Mei Yamazaki

Dai Jinsei Never Been Better! Vocalist 

Main Voc: Mizuki Fukumura

Center Voc: Sakura Oda, Miki Nonaka, Maria Makino, Akane Haga, Kaede Kaga, Reina Yokoyama, Rio Kitagawa, Homare Okamura, Mei Yamazaki

Minor Voc: Erina Ikuta, Ayumi Ishida, Chisaki Morito

Track listing

CD 
Limited Editions A-B, Regular Editions

Chu Chu Chu Bokura no Mirai
Dai・Jinsei Never Been Better!
Chu Chu Chu Bokura no Mirai (Instrumental)
Dai・Jinsei Never Been Better! (Instrumental)

Limited Edition SP
Chu Chu Chu Bokura no Mirai
Dai・Jinsei Never Been Better!
I WISH (Additional Track)
Chu Chu Chu Bokura no Mirai (Instrumental)
Dai・Jinsei Never Been Better! (Instrumental)

Limited Edition A Blu-ray

Chu Chu Chu Bokura no Mirai (Music Video)
Chu Chu Chu Bokura no Mirai (Dance Shot Ver.)
Chu Chu Chu Bokura no Mirai (Making Eizou)

Limited Edition B Blu-ray

Dai・Jinsei Never Been Better! (Music Video)
Dai・Jinsei Never Been Better! (Dance Shot Ver.)
Dai・Jinsei Never Been Better! (Making Eizou)

Limited Edition SP Blu-ray

I WISH (Music Video)
I WISH (Dance Shot Ver.)
I WISH (Making Eizou)

Charts

References 

Morning Musume songs
2022 singles
Zetima Records singles
Songs written by Tsunku
Hello! Project songs
Dance-pop songs